Church in These Streets is the eighth studio album by American rapper Jeezy. It was released on November 13, 2015, by Def Jam Recordings and CTE World. The album was supported by four singles: "God", "Church in These Streets", "Gold Bottles" and "Sweet Life" featuring Janelle Monáe.

Singles
On September 4, 2015, the album's first single, "God", was released. On September 23, 2015, the album's second single, "Church in These Streets", was released. On October 9, 2015, the album's third single, "Gold Bottles", was released. On October 16, 2015, the album's fourth single, "Sweet Life" featuring Janelle Monáe, was released.

Critical reception

Church in These Streets received generally positive reviews from music critics. At Metacritic, which assigns a normalized rating out of 100 to reviews from mainstream critics, the album received an average score of 69 based on 5 reviews, which indicates "generally favorable reviews". David Jeffries of AllMusic said, "When taking in a full album, his monotone, bellowing delivery is an acquired taste, and with only a few guest shots, plus a long track list, newcomers might find this big LP a tough go. Regardless, the ambitious Church in These Streets stands with the man's great Thug Motivation 101 while beating that album on artistic merit and meaningful lyrics." Aaron McKrell of HipHopDX stated, "With Church in These Streets, Jeezy has succeeded in staying fresh through six albums. Church in These Streets is a batch of trap-based jams that will inspire its target audience and delight a wide array of listeners." Matthew Ramirez of Pitchfork Media said, "The best Jeezy music often exploited how far he could go with memorable ad libs and punchlines, a triumphant kind of simplicity. Here that gets muted to muddied results."

Commercial performance
Church in These Streets debuted at number four on the US Billboard 200 with 107,000 equivalent album units and first week sales of 98,000 copies in the United States. As of December 2015, Church in These Streets has sold 140,000 copies in the United States.

Track listing
Credits adapted from the album's liner notes.

Notes
  signifies a co-producer
  signifies a vocal producer
 "God" features additional vocals from Tasha Catour

Sample credits
 "Lost Souls" contains an audio excerpts from the motion picture entitled "Street Life".
 "No Other Way" contains an interpolation from Miami Nights 1984's original composition Astral Projection.
 "Just Win" contains audio excerpts of a motivational speech by Les Brown and a sample of "Main Theme" from L.A. Noire, written by Andrew Hale and Simon Hale.

Personnel
Credits adapted from the album's liner notes.

Performers
 Jeezy – primary artist
 Janelle Monáe – featured artist 
 Monica – featured artist 
 Tasha Catour – additional vocals 

Musicians
 Julian Michael – guitar 

Technical
 Seth Firkins – mixer 
 Micah Wyatt – recording engineer 
 Andres "Muzzy" Solis – recording engineer 
 V12 – recording engineer 
 Miles Walker – mixer 
 Ryan Jumper – assistant mixer 
 Nick Speed – assistant recording engineer 
 Tony Rey – recording engineer 
 Leslie Brathwaite – mixer 

Production
 D. Rich – producer 
 Cassius Jay – producer 
 Beezo – producer 
 London on da Track – producer 
 Nard & B – producer 
 XL Eagle – producer , co-producer 
 Will-A-Fool – producer 
 Southside – producer 
 TM88 – producer 
 Zaytoven – producer 
 C4 – producer 
 Supah Mario – producer 
 Blanco The Ear - vocal producer 
 Smurf – producer 
 Rance – co-producer

Charts

Weekly charts

Year-end charts

References

2015 albums
Jeezy albums
Def Jam Recordings albums
Albums produced by Southside (record producer)
Albums produced by Zaytoven
Albums produced by Nard & B
Albums produced by TM88
Albums produced by London on da Track